The Namibia Premier Football League (NPFL) is the highest level of domestic association football in Namibia. It operates under the auspices of the Namibia Football Association.

History  
After ongoing problems with the Namibia Premier League (NPL), the Namibia Football Association founded the new league themselves.

Clubs 

Twelve clubs currently compete in the league for the 2021 season.

References

External links 
Official website
Official Facebook

 
Football leagues in Namibia
Namibia
2021 establishments in Namibia
Sports leagues established in 2021